Kiss Kiss... Bang Bang is a 1966 Eurospy comedy film directed by Duccio Tessari and starring Giuliano Gemma, Nieves Navarro, George Martin, and Daniele Vargas.

Plot
Former spy Kirk Warren has been sentenced to death after he was caught attempting to steal a million dollars. At the last minute he is given the chance to redeem himself by seizing a secret formula before the notorious terrorist Mr. X can get hold of it. Warren pretends to comply with his assignment but actually plans to sell the formula to Mr. X instead of delivering it to the British Secret Service.

Cast 
 Giuliano Gemma as Kirk Warren
 George Martin as Chico Pérez
 Lorella De Luca as Frida Kadar
 Nieves Navarro as Alina Shakespeare Daniele Vargas as Tol Lim
 George Rigaud as Sir Sebastian Wilcox
 Antonio Casas as Prof. Padereski

Production
The film was shot in Rome and London. The film was made at behest of Giuliano Gemma wanting to take on a genre different from the usual spaghetti westerns he made throughout the decade, while the Eurospy sub-genre was popular at the time. Most of the cast and crew, including director Duccio Tessari, were frequent collaborators in westerns, especially the Ringo films.

Score
The opening song for the film was composed by Bruno Nicolai and Pino Cassia and sung by Nancy Cuomo.

ReleasesKiss Kiss... Bang Bang'' was distributed in Italy by Cineriz and released on 16 May 1966.

Bibliography

References

External links
 

1966 films
1960s Italian-language films
1966 adventure films
1960s spy thriller films
Films directed by Duccio Tessari
Italian spy thriller films
Films scored by Bruno Nicolai
Parody films based on James Bond films
1960s Italian films